Tiberio Ancora (born 30 October 1965 in Italy) is an Italian retired footballer.

References

Italian footballers
Living people
1965 births
Association football defenders
A.C.R. Messina players
S.S. Monopoli 1966 players